This is a list of neighbourhoods (Turkish: mahalle)  of Istanbul, Turkey, classified by the districts of Istanbul. Neighbourhoods are not considered an administrative division of the districts, but they have legally established borders and a "head man" (called muhtar in Turkish) who are elected by universal suffrage and have minor duties like certifying copies of certain documents, especially one related to the "official residence" of the people living in the neighbourhood. (Turkish legislation requires presenting an official "certificate of residence" for several needs of the citizens and resident foreigners alike; such as enrolling in electoral registers or for applying to a job that requires being a resident of the concerned district or province, or for requesting certain public or municipal services.)

Other than these traditional and officially recognised mahalles or neighbourhoods, there are also quarters (in Turkish: semt) which do not have officially determined borders and the word is used in a more casual way; in most cases referring to more than one mahalle or in others only one, which may have an official name and a traditional one.

Neighbourhoods by districts

Adalar 
 Burgazada 
 Heybeliada 
 Kınalıada 
 Maden 
 Nizam

Arnavutköy 
 Anadolu 
 Arnavutköy İmrahor 
 Arnavutköy İslambey 
 Arnavutköy Merkez 
 Arnavutköy Yavuzselim 
 Atatürk 
 Bahşayış 
 Boğazköy Atatürk 
 Boğazköy İstiklal 
 Boğazköy Merkez 
 Bolluca 
 Deliklikaya 
 Dursunköy 
 Durusu Cami 
 Durusu Zafer 
 Hastane 
 İstasyon 
 Sazlıbosna 
 Nakkaş 
 Karlıbayır 
 Haraççı 
 Hicret 
 Mavigöl 
 Nenehatun 
 Ömerli 
 Taşoluk 
 Taşoluk Adnan Menderes 
 Taşoluk Çilingir 
 Taşoluk Fatih 
 Taşoluk M. Fevzi Çakmak 
 Taşoluk Mehmet Akif Ersoy 
 Yeşilbayır

Ataşehir 
 Aşıkveysel, Ataşehir 
 Atatürk, Ataşehir 
 Barbaros, Ataşehir 
 Esatpaşa, Ataşehir 
 Ferhatpaşa, Ataşehir 
 Fetih, Ataşehir 
 İçerenköy, Ataşehir 
 İnönü, Ataşehir 
 Kayışdağı, Ataşehir 
 Küçükbakkalköy, Ataşehir 
 Mevlana, Ataşehir 
 Mimarsinan, Ataşehir 
 Mustafa Kemal, Ataşehir 
 Örnek, Ataşehir 
 Yeniçamlıca, Ataşehir 
 Yenişehir, Ataşehir 
 Yenisahra, Ataşehir

Avcılar 
 Ambarlı, Avcılar 
 Cihangir, Avcılar 
 Denizköşkler, Avcılar 
 Firuzköy, Avcılar 
 Gümüşpala, Avcılar 
 Merkez, Avcılar 
 Mustafa Kemal Paşa, Avcılar 
 Tahtakale, Avcılar 
 Üniversite, Avcılar 
 Yeşilkent, Avcılar

Bağcılar 
 Bağlar, Bağcılar 
 Barbaros, Bağcılar 
 Çınar, Bağcılar 
 Demirkapı, Bağcılar 
 Evren, Bağcılar 
 Fatih, Bağcılar 
 Fevzi Çakmak, Bağcılar 
 Göztepe, Bağcılar 
 Güneşli, Bağcılar 
 Hürriyet, Bağcılar 
 İnönü, Bağcılar 
 Kâzım Karabekir, Bağcılar 
 Kemalpaşa, Bağcılar 
 Kirazlı, Bağcılar 
 Mahmutbey, Bağcılar 
 Merkez, Bağcılar 
 Sancaktepe, Bağcılar 
 Yavuzselim, Bağcılar 
 Yenigün, Bağcılar 
 Yenimahalle, Bağcılar 
 Yıldıztepe, Bağcılar 
 Yüzyıl, Bağcılar

Bahçelievler 
 Bahçelievler, Bahçelievler 
 Cumhuriyet, Bahçelievler 
 Çobançeşme, Bahçelievler 
 Fevzi Çakmak, Bahçelievler 
 Hürriyet, Bahçelievler 
 Kocasinan, Bahçelievler 
 Siyavuşpaşa, Bahçelievler 
 Soğanlı, Bahçelievler 
 Şirinevler, Bahçelievler 
 Yenibosna, Bahçelievler 
 Zafer, Bahçelievler

Bakırköy 
 Ataköy 1. kısım, Bakırköy 
 Ataköy 2-5-6. kısım, Bakırköy 
 Ataköy 3-4-11. kısım, Bakırköy 
 Ataköy 7-8-9-10. kısım, Bakırköy 
 Basınköy, Bakırköy 
 Cevizlik, Bakırköy 
 Kartaltepe, Bakırköy 
 Osmaniye, Bakırköy 
 Sakızağacı, Bakırköy 
 Şenlikköy, Bakırköy 
 Yenimahalle, Bakırköy 
 Yeşilköy 
 Yeşilyurt 
 Zeytinlik, Bakırköy 
 Zuhuratbaba, Bakırköy

Başakşehir 
 Altınşehir, Başakşehir 
 Bahçeşehir 1. Kısım, Başakşehir 
 Bahçeşehir 2. Kısım, Başakşehir 
 Başak, Başakşehir 
 Başakşehir, Başakşehir 
 Güvercintepe, Başakşehir 
 Kayabaşı, Başakşehir 
 Şahintepe, Başakşehir 
 Ziya Gökalp, Başakşehir

Bayrampaşa 
 Altıntepsi, Bayrampaşa 
 Cevatpaşa, Bayrampaşa 
 İsmetpaşa, Bayrampaşa 
 Kartaltepe, Bayrampaşa 
 Kocatepe, Bayrampaşa 
 Muratpaşa, Bayrampaşa 
 Orta, Bayrampaşa 
 Terazidere, Bayrampaşa 
 Vatan, Bayrampaşa 
 Yenidoğan, Bayrampaşa 
 Yıldırım, Bayrampaşa

Beşiktaş 
 Abbasağa 
 Akatlar 
 Arnavutköy 
 Balmumcu 
 Bebek 
 Cihannüma 
 Dikilitaş 
 Etiler 
 Gayrettepe 
 Konaklar 
 Kuruçeşme 
 Kültür 
 Levazım 
 Levent 
 Mecidiye 
 Muradiye 
 Nisbetiye 
 Ortaköy 
 Sinanpaşa 
 Türkali 
 Ulus 
 Vişnezade 
 Yıldız

Beykoz 
 Acarlar, Beykoz 
 Anadoluhisarı, Beykoz 
 Anadolukavağı, Beykoz 
 Baklacı, Beykoz 
 Çamlıbahçe, Beykoz 
 Çengeldere, Beykoz 
 Çiftlik, Beykoz 
 Çiğdem, Beykoz 
 Çubuklu, Beykoz 
 Fatih, Beykoz 
 Göksu, Beykoz 
 Göztepe, Beykoz 
 Gümüşsuyu, Beykoz 
 İncirköy, Beykoz 
 Kanlıca, Beykoz 
 Kavacık, Beykoz 
 Merkez, Beykoz 
 Ortaçeşme, Beykoz 
 Paşabahçe, Beykoz 
 Rüzgarlıbahçe, Beykoz 
 Soğuksu, Beykoz 
 Tokatköy, Beykoz 
 Yalıköy, Beykoz 
 Yavuz Selim, Beykoz 
 Yenimahalle, Beykoz

Beylikdüzü 
 Adnan Kahveci, Beylikdüzü 
 Barış, Beylikdüzü 
 Büyükşehir, Beylikdüzü 
 Cumhuriyet, Beylikdüzü 
 Dereağzı, Beylikdüzü 
 Gürpınar, Beylikdüzü 
 Kavaklı, Beylikdüzü 
 Marmara, Beylikdüzü 
 Sahil, Beylikdüzü 
 Yakuplu, Beylikdüzü

Beyoğlu 
 Arapcami, Beyoğlu 
 Asmalımescit, Beyoğlu 
 Bedrettin, Beyoğlu 
 Bereketzade, Beyoğlu 
 Bostan, Beyoğlu 
 Bülbül, Beyoğlu 
 Camiikebir, Beyoğlu 
 Cihangir 
 Çatmamescit, Beyoğlu 
 Çukur, Beyoğlu 
 Emekyemez, Beyoğlu 
 Evliya Çelebi, Beyoğlu 
 Fetihtepe, Beyoğlu 
 Firuzağa, Beyoğlu 
 Gümüşsuyu, Beyoğlu 
 Hacıahmet, Beyoğlu 
 Hacımimi, Beyoğlu 
 Halıcıoğlu, Beyoğlu 
 Hüseyinağa, Beyoğlu 
 İstiklal, Beyoğlu 
 Kadı Mehmet Efendi, Beyoğlu 
 Kamerhatun, Beyoğlu 
 Kalyoncukulluğu, Beyoğlu 
 Kaptanpaşa, Beyoğlu 
 Katip Mustafa Çelebi, Beyoğlu 
 Keçecipiri, Beyoğlu 
 Kemankeş Kara Mustafa Paşa, Beyoğlu 
 Kılıçalipaşa, Beyoğlu 
 Kocatepe, Beyoğlu 
 Kulaksız, Beyoğlu 
 Kuloğlu, Beyoğlu 
 Küçükpiyale, Beyoğlu 
 Müeyyetzade, Beyoğlu 
 Ömeravni, Beyoğlu 
 Örnektepe, Beyoğlu 
 Piripaşa, Beyoğlu 
 Piyalepaşa, Beyoğlu 
 Pürtelaş, Beyoğlu 
 Sururi, Beyoğlu 
 Sütlüce, Beyoğlu 
 Şahkulu, Beyoğlu 
 Şehit Muhtar, Beyoğlu 
 Tomtom, Beyoğlu 
 Yahya Kahya, Beyoğlu 
 Yenişehir, Beyoğlu

Büyükçekmece 
 19 Mayıs, Büyükçekmece 
 Ahmediye, Büyükçekmece 
 Alkent, Büyükçekmece 
 Atatürk, Büyükçekmece 
 Bahçelievler, Büyükçekmece 
 Batıköy, Büyükçekmece 
 Celaliye, Büyükçekmece 
 Cumhuriyet, Büyükçekmece 
 Çakmaklı, Büyükçekmece 
 Dizdariye, Büyükçekmece 
 Fatih, Büyükçekmece 
 Güzelce, Büyükçekmece 
 Hürriyet, Büyükçekmece 
 Kamiloba, Büyükçekmece 
 Karaağaç, Büyükçekmece 
 Kumburgaz Merkez, Büyükçekmece 
 Mimarsinan, Büyükçekmece 
 Muratbey, Büyükçekmece 
 Muratçeşme, Büyükçekmece 
 Pınartepe, Büyükçekmece 
 Türkoba, Büyükçekmece 
 Ulus, Büyükçekmece 
 Yenimahalle, Büyükçekmece

Çatalca 
 Binkılıç, Çatalca
 Çakıl, Çatalca 
 Çiftlikköy, Çatalca 
 Fatih, Çatalca
 Ferhatpaşa, Çatalca 
 İzettin, Çatalca 
 Kaleiçi, Çatalca 
 Karacaköy, Çatalca 
 Ovayenice, Çatalca

Çekmeköy 
 Alemdağ, Çekmeköy 
 Aydınlar, Çekmeköy 
 Cumhuriyet, Çekmeköy 
 Çamlık, Çekmeköy 
 Çatalmeşe, Çekmeköy 
 Ekşioğlu, Çekmeköy 
 Güngören, Çekmeköy 
 Hamidiye, Çekmeköy 
 Kirazlıdere, Çekmeköy 
 Mehmet Akif, Çekmeköy 
 Merkez, Çekmeköy 
 Mimar Sinan, Çekmeköy 
 Nişantepe, Çekmeköy 
 Ömerli, Çekmeköy 
 Soğukpınar, Çekmeköy 
 Sultançiftliği, Çekmeköy 
 Taşdelen, Çekmeköy

Esenler 
 Birlik, Esenler 
 Çiftehavuzlar, Esenler 
 Davutpaşa, Esenler 
 Fatih, Esenler 
 Fevzi Çakmak, Esenler 
 Havaalanı, Esenler 
 Kâzım Karabekir, Esenler 
 Kemer, Esenler 
 Menderes, Esenler 
 Mimarsinan, Esenler 
 Namık Kemal, Esenler 
 Nenehatun, Esenler 
 Oruçreis, Esenler 
 Tuna, Esenler 
 Turgutreis, Esenler 
 Yavuz Selim, Esenler

Esenyurt 
 Ardıçlıevler, Esenyurt 
 Atatürk, Esenyurt 
 Cumhuriyet, Esenyurt 
 Çakmaklı, Esenyurt 
 Esenkent, Esenyurt 
 Fatih, Esenyurt 
 Güzelyurt (Haramidere), Esenyurt 
 İncirtepe, Esenyurt 
 İnönü, Esenyurt 
 İstiklal, Esenyurt 
 Mehterçeşme, Esenyurt 
 Merkez, Esenyurt 
 Namik Kemal, Esenyurt 
 Örnek, Esenyurt 
 Pınar, Esenyurt 
 Saadetdere, Esenyurt 
 Sanayii, Esenyurt 
 Talatpasa, Esenyurt 
 Yenikent, Esenyurt 
 Yeşilkent, Esenyurt

Eyüp 
 Akşemsettin, Eyüp 
 Alibeyköy, Eyüp 
 Çırçır, Eyüp 
 Defterdar, Eyüp 
 Düğmeciler, Eyüp 
 Emniyettepe, Eyüp 
 Esentepe, Eyüp 
 Merkez, Eyüp 
 Göktürk, Eyüp 
 Güzeltepe, Eyüp 
 İslambey, Eyüp 
 Karadolap, Eyüp 
 Mimarsinan, Eyüp 
 Mithatpaşa, Eyüp 
 Nişanca, Eyüp 
 Rami Cuma, Eyüp 
 Rami Yeni, Eyüp 
 Sakarya, Eyüp 
 Silahtarağa, Eyüp 
 Topçular, Eyüp 
 Yeşilpınar, Eyüp

Fatih 
 Aksaray, Fatih 
 Akşemsettin, Fatih 
 Alemdar, Fatih 
 Ali Kuşçu, Fatih 
 Atikali, Fatih 
 Ayvansaray, Fatih 
 Balabanağa, Fatih 
 Balat, Fatih 
 Beyazıt, Fatih 
 Binbirdirek, Fatih 
 Cankurtaran, Fatih 
 Cerrahpaşa, Fatih 
 Cibali, Fatih 
 Demirtaş, Fatih 
 Derviş Ali, Fatih 
 Eminsinan, Fatih 
 Hacıkadın, Fatih 
 Hasekisultan, Fatih 
 Hırkaişerif, Fatih 
 Hobyar, Fatih 
 Hoca Giyasettin, Fatih 
 Hocapaşa, Fatih 
 İskenderpaşa, Fatih 
 Kalenderhane, Fatih 
 Karagümrük, Fatih 
 Katip Kasım, Fatih 
 Kemalpaşa, Fatih 
 Kocamustafapaşa, Fatih 
 Küçükayasofya, Fatih 
 Mercan, Fatih 
 Mesihpaşa, Fatih 
 Mevlanakapı, Fatih 
 Mimar Hayrettin, Fatih 
 Mimar Kemalettin, Fatih 
 Mollafenari, Fatih 
 Mollagürani, Fatih 
 Mollahüsrev, Fatih 
 Muhsinehatun, Fatih 
 Nişanca, Fatih 
 Rüstempaşa, Fatih 
 Saraçishak, Fatih 
 Sarıdemir, Fatih 
 Seyyid Ömer, Fatih 
 Silivrikapı, Fatih 
 Sultanahmet, Fatih 
 Sururi, Fatih 
 Süleymaniye, Fatih 
 Sümbülefendi, Fatih 
 Şehremini, Fatih 
 Şehsuvarbey, Fatih 
 Tahtakale, Fatih 
 Tayahatun, Fatih 
 Topkapı, Fatih 
 Yavuzsinan, Fatih 
 Yavuz Sultan Selim, Fatih 
 Yedikule, Fatih 
 Zeyrek, Fatih

Gaziosmanpaşa 
 Bağlarbaşı 
 Barbaros Hayrettin Paşa 
 Fevzi Çakmak 
 Hürriyet 
 Karadeniz 
 Karayolları 
 Karlıtepe 
 Kâzım Karabekir 
 Merkez 
 Mevlana 
 Pazariçi 
 Sarıgöl 
 Şemsipaşa 
 Yenidoğan 
 Yenimahalle 
 Yıldıztabya

Güngören 
 Akıncılar, Güngören 
 Abdurrahman Nafiz Gürman, Güngören 
 Gençosman, Güngören 
 Güneştepe, Güngören 
 Güven, Güngören 
 Haznedar, Güngören 
 Mareşal Fevzi Çakmak, Güngören 
 Mehmet Nezih Özmen, Güngören 
 Merkez, Güngören 
 Sanayi, Güngören 
 Tozkoparan, Güngören

Kadıköy 
 19 Mayıs, Kadıköy 
 Acıbadem, Kadıköy 
 Bostancı, Kadıköy 
 Caddebostan, Kadıköy 
 Caferağa, Kadıköy 
 Dumlupınar, Kadıköy 
 Eğitim, Kadıköy 
 Erenköy, Kadıköy 
 Fenerbahçe, Kadıköy 
 Feneryolu, Kadıköy 
 Fikirtepe, Kadıköy 
 Göztepe, Kadıköy 
 Hasanpaşa, Kadıköy 
 Koşuyolu, Kadıköy 
 Kozyatağı, Kadıköy 
 Merdivenköy, Kadıköy
 Osmanağa, Kadıköy 
 Rasimpaşa, Kadıköy 
 Sahrayıcedid, Kadıköy 
 Suadiye, Kadıköy 
 Zühtüpaşa, Kadıköy

Kağıthane 
 Çağlayan 
 Çeliktepe 
 Gültepe 
 Emniyet 
 Gürsel 
 Hamidiye 
 
 Hürriyet 
 Mehmet Akif Ersoy 
 Merkez 
 Nurtepe 
 Ortabayır 
 Sanayi 
 Seyrantepe
 Şirintepe 
 Talatpaşa 
 Telsizler 
 Yahya Kemal 
 Yeşilce

Kartal 
 Atalar, Kartal 
 Cevizli, Kartal 
 Cumhuriyet, Kartal 
 Çavuşoğlu, Kartal 
 Esentepe, Kartal 
 Gümüşpınar, Kartal 
 Hürriyet, Kartal 
 Karlıktepe, Kartal 
 Kordonboyu, Kartal 
 Orhantepe, Kartal 
 Ortamahalle, Kartal 
 Petrol-İş, Kartal 
 Soğanlık, Kartal 
 Topselvi, Kartal 
 Uğur Mumcu, Kartal 
 Yakacık Çarşı, Kartal 
 Yakacık Yeni, Kartal 
 Yalı, Kartal 
 Yukarımahalle, Kartal 
 Yunus, Kartal

Küçükçekmece 
 Atakent, Küçükçekmece 
 Atatürk, Küçükçekmece 
 Beşyol, Küçükçekmece 
 Cennet, Küçükçekmece 
 Cumhuriyet, Küçükçekmece 
 Fatih, Küçükçekmece 
 Fevzi Çakmak, Küçükçekmece 
 Gültepe, Küçükçekmece 
 Halkalı, Küçükçekmece 
 İnönü, Küçükçekmece 
 İstasyon, Küçükçekmece 
 Kanarya, Küçükçekmece 
 Kartaltepe, Küçükçekmece 
 Kemalpaşa, Küçükçekmece 
 Mehmet Akif, Küçükçekmece 
 Söğütlüçeşme, Küçükçekmece 
 Sultanmurat, Küçükçekmece 
 Tevfikbey, Küçükçekmece 
 Yarımburgaz, Küçükçekmece 
 Yenimahalle, Küçükçekmece 
 Yeşilova, Küçükçekmece

Maltepe 
 Altayçeşme, Maltepe 
 Altıntepe, Maltepe 
 Aydınevler, Maltepe 
 Bağlarbaşı, Maltepe 
 Başıbüyük, Maltepe 
 Büyükbakkalköy, Maltepe 
 Cevizli, Maltepe 
 Çınar, Maltepe 
 Esenkent, Maltepe 
 Feyzullah, Maltepe 
 Fındıklı, Maltepe 
 Girne, Maltepe 
 Gülensu, Maltepe 
 Gülsuyu, Maltepe 
 İdealtepe, Maltepe 
 Küçükyalı, Maltepe 
 Yalı, Maltepe 
 Zümrütevler, Maltepe

Pendik 
 Ahmet Yesevi, Pendik 
 Bahçelievler, Pendik 
 Batı, Pendik 
 Çamçeşme, Pendik 
 Çamlık, Pendik 
 Çınardere, Pendik 
 Doğu, Pendik 
 Dumlupınar, Pendik 
 Ertuğrulgazi, Pendik 
 Esenler, Pendik 
 Esenyalı, Pendik 
 Fatih, Pendik 
 Fevzi Çakmak, Pendik 
 Güllübağlar, Pendik 
 Güzelyalı, Pendik 
 Harmandere, Pendik 
 Kavakpınar, Pendik 
 Kaynarca, Pendik 
 Kurtköy, Pendik 
 Orhangazi, Pendik 
 Orta, Pendik 
 Ramazanoğlu, Pendik 
 Sanayi, Pendik 
 Sapanbağları, Pendik 
 Sülüntepe, Pendik 
 Şeyhli, Pendik 
 Velibaba, Pendik 
 Yayalar, Pendik 
 Yenimahalle, Pendik 
 Yenişehir, Pendik 
 Yeşilbağlar, Pendik

Sancaktepe 
 Abdurrahmangazi, Sancaktepe 
 Akpınar, Sancaktepe 
 Atatürk, Sancaktepe 
 Emek, Sancaktepe 
 Eyüpsultan, Sancaktepe 
 Fatih, Sancaktepe 
 Hilal, Sancaktepe 
 İnönü, Sancaktepe 
 Kemal Türkler, Sancaktepe 
 Meclis, Sancaktepe 
 Merve, Sancaktepe 
 Mevlana, Sancaktepe 
 Osmangazi, Sancaktepe 
 Safa, Sancaktepe 
 Sarıgazi, Sancaktepe 
 Veysel Karani, Sancaktepe 
 Yenidoğan, Sancaktepe 
 Yunus Emre, Sancaktepe

Sarıyer 
 Ayazağa 
 Baltalimanı 
 Bahçeköy Kemer 
 Bahçeköy 
 Bahçeköy Yenimahalle 
 Büyükdere 
 Cumhuriyet 
 
 Darüşşafaka 
 Derbent 
 Emirgân 
 Fatih Sultan Mehmet 
 Ferahevler 
 Huzur 
 İstinye 
 Kâzım Karabekir 
 Kireçburnu 
 Kocataş 
 Maden 
 Maslak 
 Pınar 
 Poligon 
 PTT Evleri 
 Reşitpaşa 
 Rumelihisarı 
 Rumelikavağı 
 Merkez, Sarıyer 
 Tarabya 
 Yeniköy 
 Yenimahalle

Silivri 
 Alibey 
 Alipaşa 
 Büyük Çavuşlu 
 Cumhuriyet 
 Çanta Fatih 
 Çanta Mimarsinan 
 Değirmenköy İsmetpaşa 
 Değirmenköy Fevzipaşa 
 Fatih 
 Gazitepe 
 Gümüşyaka 
 Kadıköy 
 Kavaklı Hürriyet 
 Kavaklı Cumhuriyet 
 Küçük Kılıçlı 
 Mimarsinan 
 Ortaköy 
 Piri Mehmet Paşa 
 Selimpaşa 
 Semizkumlar 
 Yeni Mahalle 
 Yolçatı

Sultanbeyli 
 Abdurrahmangazi 
 Adil 
 Ahmet Yesevi 
 Akşemsettin 
 Battalgazi 
 Fatih 
 Hamidiye 
 Hasanpaşa 
 Mecidiye 
 Mehmet Akif 
 Mimarsinan 
 Necip Fazıl 
 Orhangazi 
 Turgutreis 
 Yavuz Selim

Sultangazi 
 50. Yıl 
 75. Yıl 
 Cebeci 
 Cumhuriyet 
 Esentepe 
 Eski Habibler 
 Gazi 
 Habibler 
 İsmetpaşa 
 Malkoçoğlu 
 Sultançiftliği 
 Uğur Mumcu 
 Yayla 
 Yunusemre 
 Zübeydehanım

Şile 
 Ağva 
 Balibey 
 Çavuş 
 Hacıkasım 
 Kumbaba

Şişli 
 19 Mayıs 
 Bozkurt 
 Cumhuriyet 
 Duatepe 
 Ergenekon 
 Esentepe 
 Eskişehir 
 Feriköy 
 Fulya 
 Gülbahar 
 Halaskargazi 
 Halide Edip Adıvar 
 Halil Rıfat Paşa 
 Harbiye 
 İnönü 
 İzzetpaşa 
 Kaptanpaşa 
 Kuştepe 
 Mahmut Şevket Paşa 
 Mecidiyeköy
 Merkez 
 Meşrutiyet 
 Paşa 
 Teşvikiye 
 Yayla

Tuzla 
 Anadolu 
 Aydınlı 
 Aydıntepe 
 Cami 
 Evliya Çelebi 
 Fatih 
 Fırat 
 İçmeler 
 İstasyon 
 Mescit 
 Mimarsinan 
 Orhanlı
 Orta 
 Postane 
 Şifa 
 Tepeören 
 Yayla

Ümraniye 
 Adem Yavuz 
 Altınşehir 
 Armağanevler 
 Aşağıdudullu 
 Ataken 
 Atatürk 
 Cemil Meriç 
 Çakmak 
 Çamlık
 Dumlupınar 
 Elmalıkent 
 Esenevler 
 Esenşehir 
 Fatih Sultan Mehmet 
 Hekimbaşı 
 Huzur 
 Ihlamurkuyu 
 İnkılap 
 İstiklal 
 Kâzım Karabekir 
 Mehmet Akif 
 Madenler 
 Namık Kemal 
 Necip Fazıl 
 Parseller 
 Saray 
 Site 
 Şerifali 
 Tantavi 
 Tatlısu 
 Tepeüstü 
 Topağacı 
 Yamanevler 
 Yeni Sanayi 
 Yukarıdudullu

Üsküdar 
 Acıbadem 
 Ahmediye 
 Altunizade 
 Aziz Mahmud Hüdayi 
 Bahçelievler 
 Barbaros 
 Beylerbeyi 
 Bulgurlu 
 Burhaniye 
 Cumhuriyet 
 Çengelköy 
 Ferah 
 Güzeltepe 
 İcadiye 
 Kandilli 
 Kirazlıtepe 
 Kısıklı 
 Kuleli 
 Kuzguncuk 
 Küçük Çamlıca 
 Küçüksu 
 Küplüce
 Mehmet Akif Ersoy 
 Mimar Sinan 
 Murat Reis 
 Salacak iguat
 Selami Ali 
 Selimiye 
 Sultantepe 
 Ünalan 
 Valide-i Atik 
 Yavuztürk 
 Zeynep Kamil

Zeytinburnu 
 Beştelsiz 
 Çırpıcı 
 Gökalp 
 Kazlıçeşme 
 Maltepe 
 Merkezefendi 
 Nuripaşa 
 Seyitnizam 
 Sümer 
 Telsiz 
 Veliefendi 
 Yenidoğan 
 Yeşiltepe

Further reading
 A criticism of the Orientalist approach to Istanbul's neighbourhoods (In Turkish, with an English abstract)

External links 
 Teaser of TGRT TV programme "İstanbul'un Mahalleleri (Neighbourhoods of Istanbul)"

 
Neighbourhood
Istanbul